The following outline is provided as an overview of and introduction to Vatican City:

Vatican City – an ecclesiastical or sacerdotal-monarchical state, being the sovereign territory of the Holy See and ruled by the Bishop of Rome—the Pope, the leader of the worldwide Catholic Church. The territory of this landlocked sovereign city-state consists of a walled enclave within the city of Rome, Italy. This makes Vatican City the smallest independent state in the world by both area and population.

General reference 

 Pronunciation: 
 Common English country name: Vatican City
 Official English country name: Vatican City State
 Common endonym(s): Vatican City State
 Official endonym(s): Stato della Città del Vaticano,
 Adjectival(s): Vatican
 Demonym(s): Citizen of Vatican City 
 Etymology: See Vatican Hill
 ISO country codes: VA, VAT, 336
 ISO region codes: none
 Internet country code top-level domain: .va

Geography of Vatican City 

Geography of Vatican City
 Vatican City is:
 A walled enclave within the city of Rome
 A sovereign city-state
 A European microstate
 Land boundaries:  3.2 km
 Coastline: none
 Population: 825 (2019) - 240th
 Size:  - 258th
 Atlas of Vatican City

Location of Vatican City 
 Vatican City is situated within the following regions:
 Eastern Hemisphere
 Northern Hemisphere
 Eurasia
 Europe
 Southern Europe
 Italian Peninsula
 Surrounded by Italy
 Surrounded by Lazio
 Surrounded by Rome
 Time zone: Central European Time (UTC+01), Central European Summer Time (UTC+02)
 Extreme points of Vatican City
 High: unnamed location 
 Low: Saint Peter's Square

Environment of Vatican City 

 Climate of Vatican City
 Ecoregions in Vatican City: none
 Protected areas of Vatican City: none

Natural geographic features of Vatican City 
Vatican City is an enclave in an urban area, and lacks the geographic features common to (much larger) countries:

 Lakes: none
 Mountains: none
 Rivers: none
 Valleys: none
 World Heritage Sites in Vatican City: Vatican City is itself a World Heritage Site

Regions of Vatican City 
 None
 Vatican City is inside Rome, which in turn lies within the Lazio region of Italy
 Vatican City lies next to the Borgo district in Rome.

Ecoregions of Vatican City 
 None

Administrative divisions of Vatican City 
 Vatican City has no administrative divisions.

Demography of Vatican City 

Demographics of Vatican City

Government and politics of Vatican City 

Politics of Vatican City
 Form of government: Ecclesiastical; sacerdotal-monarchical; absolute monarchy; elective monarchy; elective theocracy (disputed application).
 Capital: Vatican City
 Association of Vatican Lay Workers
 Elections in Vatican City
 Political parties in Vatican City: none. Vatican City is in the jurisdiction of the Holy See, which has absolute authority over it.
 Political scandals of Vatican City
 Banco Ambrosiano
 Gone with the Wind in the Vatican
 Roman Question
 Vatican Apostolic Archive

Branches of the government of Vatican City 

Government of Vatican City

Executive branch of the government of Vatican City 
 Head of state: Pope, currently Jorge Mario Bergoglio as Pope Francis
 Head of government: President of the Governatorate of Vatican City, Giuseppe Bertello
 Governatorate of Vatican City

Legislative branch of the government of Vatican City 
 Absolute legislative authority: Pope, currently Pope Francis
 Secretariat of State
 Pontifical Commission for Vatican City State
 President of the Pontifical Commission for Vatican City State: Giovanni Lajolo
 Laws passed by the Commission must be approved by the pope through the Secretariat of State prior to being published and taking effect.

Judicial branch of the government of Vatican City 
 Absolute judicial authority: Pope, currently Pope Francis
 Supreme Court of Vatican City (Corte di Cassazione)
The Cardinal Prefect of the Apostolic Signatura serves ex officio as the President of the Supreme Court of Vatican City (Corte di Cassazione). The two other members of the Supreme Court are also Cardinals of the Apostolic Signatura and are chosen by the Cardinal Prefect on a yearly basis.
 Appellate Court of Vatican City
 Tribunal of Vatican City State
 Under the terms of article 22 the Lateran Treaty, Italy will, at the request of the Holy See, punish individuals for crimes committed within Vatican City and will itself proceed against the person who committed the offence, if that person takes refuge in Italian territory. Persons accused of crimes recognized as such both in Italy and in Vatican City that are committed in Italian territory will be handed over to the Italian authorities if they take refuge in Vatican City or in buildings that under the treaty enjoy immunity.

Foreign relations of Vatican City 
 Foreign relations of Vatican City – Vatican City State is a recognised national territory under international law, but it is the Holy See that conducts diplomatic relations on its behalf, in addition to the Holy See's own diplomacy, entering into international agreements in its regard. See also Foreign relations of the Holy See
 Diplomatic missions in Vatican City: none (Vatican City maintains diplomatic relations with no one, only the Holy See does. See below).
 Because Vatican City is too small, diplomatic missions accredited to the Holy See are situated in Rome, not in Vatican City.
 Diplomatic missions to the Holy See
 Diplomatic missions of Vatican City: none. (See below).
 The Holy See, which Vatican City is the sovereign territory of, maintains diplomatic relations with 176 countries.
 Diplomatic missions of the Holy See

International organization membership 

International organization membership of Vatican City
Vatican City State is a member of:

Council of Europe (CE) (observer)
International Atomic Energy Agency (IAEA)
International Criminal Police Organization (Interpol)
International Organization for Migration (IOM) (observer)
International Telecommunication Union (ITU)
International Telecommunications Satellite Organization (ITSO)
International Trade Union Confederation (ITUC)
Nonaligned Movement (NAM) (guest)
Organization for Security and Cooperation in Europe (OSCE)
Organisation for the Prohibition of Chemical Weapons (OPCW)

Organization of American States (OAS) (observer)
Unione Latina (observer)
United Nations (UN) (permanent observer)
United Nations Conference on Trade and Development (UNCTAD)
United Nations High Commissioner for Refugees (UNHCR)
Universal Postal Union (UPU)
World Federation of Trade Unions (WFTU)
World Intellectual Property Organization (WIPO)
World Tourism Organization (UNWTO) (observer)
World Trade Organization (WTO) (observer)

Law and order in Vatican City 

Law of Vatican City State
 Constitution: Fundamental Law of Vatican City State
 Capital punishment in Vatican City: abolished in 1969
 Crime in Vatican City (committed mostly by tourists)
 Human rights in Vatican City
 LGBT rights in Vatican City
 Lateran Treaty
 Law enforcement in Vatican City

Military in Vatican City 
Vatican City State has no military, but resident within it is the Swiss Guard.

Military in Vatican City
 Command
 Commander-in-chief: Christoph Graf
 Forces — Vatican City lies within Rome, the capital of Italy, and therefore defense is the responsibility of Italy.
 Army of Vatican City: none, see Military in Vatican City; Army of Italy
 Navy of Vatican City: none, see Navy of Italy
 Air Force of Vatican City: none, see Aeronautica Militare
 Special forces of Vatican City: none, see Special forces of Italy
 Military ranks in Vatican City

Local government in Vatican City 
 Being a city-state, the government of Vatican City is also the local government.

History of Vatican City 

History of Vatican City
 History of the Papacy
 Prisoner in the Vatican
 Governor of Vatican City
 Military history of Vatican City
 History of the Swiss Guard
 Sack of Rome (1527)

Culture of Vatican City 

Culture of Vatican City
 Architecture of Vatican City
 Saint Peter's Square
 Churches in Vatican City:
 St. Peter's Basilica
 Palaces in Vatican City:
 Apostolic Palace
 Casina Pio IV
 Domus Sanctae Marthae
 Torre San Giovanni
 National symbols of Vatican City
 Coat of arms of Vatican City
 Flag of Vatican City
 National anthem of Vatican City
 People of Vatican City
 Religion in Vatican City – Vatican City is the sovereign territory and headquarters of the Roman Catholic Church, and home of the Pope
 Christianity
 Catholicism
 Roman Catholic Church
 Pope
 Vicar General for Vatican City
 World Heritage Sites in Vatican City: Vatican City is itself a World Heritage Site

Art in Vatican City 
 Art in Vatican City
 The Resurrection
 Vatican Museums
 Anima Mundi
 Collection of Modern Religious Art
 The Gallery of Maps
 Raphael Rooms
 Sistine Chapel
The Last Judgment
 Sistine Chapel ceiling
 Literature of Vatican City
 Vatican Library
 Vatican Apostolic Archive
 Music of Vatican City

Sports in Vatican City 
 Cricket in Vatican City
 Vatican Cricket Team
 Football in Vatican City
 Vatican City national football team
 Vatican City at the Olympics: has not competed

Economy and infrastructure of Vatican City 

Economy of Vatican City
 Economic rank, by nominal GDP (2007):
 Economy type: noncommercial (based on donations from church-goers)
 Church tax
 Peter's Pence
 Agriculture in Vatican City: None. See Vatican Gardens.
 Banking in Vatican City
 Vatican Bank
 Communications in Vatican City
 Internet in Vatican City
 .va
 Vatican Library
 L'Osservatore Romano
 Octava Dies
 Vatican Radio
 Companies of Vatican City: none
Currency of Vatican City: Euro (see also: Euro topics)
 Former currency: Vatican lira
ISO 4217: EUR
 Health care in Vatican City
 Vatican Pharmacy
 Mining in Vatican City: none
 Tourism in Vatican City
 Transportation in Vatican City
 Airports in Vatican City: none. Rome is served by two airports which are used by travellers to the Vatican.
 Rail transport in Vatican City
 Roads in Vatican City (see map)
 Being only 1.05 km long and 0.85 km wide, Vatican City has no highways.
 Vatican City has access roads and driveways. (See map)

Education in Vatican City 
 Academies in Vatican City:
 Pontifical Academy of Sciences
 Pontifical Academy of Social Sciences
 Pontifical Academy for Life
 Biblioteca Apostolica Vaticana (Vatican Library)
 Includes the Vatican School of Librarianship
 Congregation for Catholic Education
 Vatican School of Palaeography, Diplomacy, and Archivistry, run by the Vatican Apostolic Archive.
 Vatican City is too small to host extensive educational facilities, but the Holy See operates 64 academic institutions close by (in Rome). The major ones are:
 Pontifical University of St. Thomas Aquinas (Angelicum)
 Pontifical Gregorian University
 Pontifical Urbaniana University
 Pontifical Lateran University
 Pontifical University of the Holy Cross
 Salesian Pontifical University
 Pontifical University Antonianum

See also 

Index of Vatican City-related articles
List of international rankings
Outline of Europe
Outline of geography
Roman Catholic Church
Holy See

References

External links 

Vatican City State—official website
Chief of State and Cabinet Members

History of Vatican City: Primary Documents
Agreement Between the Italian Republic and the Holy See, 18 February 1984
Map of Vatican City
The Vatican as a Free Society by Carlo Lottieri
Walls of Rome

World Heritage Site
Vatican City Live Webcam

Vatican City
Vatican City
Vatican City
 1
 
Outlines of the Catholic Church